Passafire is a reggae rock band based in Savannah, Georgia.

History

Formation and Self-titled album (2003–2006)
Passafire was founded in 2003 by Savannah, Georgia natives Ted Bowne on vocals/guitar and Nick Kubley on drums who at the time were students attending Savannah College of Art and Design (SCAD). Adding Tom Heet on bass and Adam Willis on keyboard, Passafire became a quartet. Their debut self-produced, self-titled album Passafire was released on August 29, 2006.

Submersible (2007)
After Heet's departure from the band, Passafire added Nick's brother Will Kubley on bass and additional vocals. Their sophomore album, Submersible was released on September 18, 2007. It was recognized by iTunes as one of the "Top 10 Best Reggae Albums of 2007".

Everyone on Everynight (2009)
Passafire's third album, Everyone on Everynight, was released on September 15, 2009 on Pepper's recording label, LAW Records.

Start From Scratch (2011)
Their fourth album, Start From Scratch was released on their on record label FlameGuy Records. It was produced by Paul Leary and debuted on September 27, 2011. The album reached #1 on the Billboard Top Reggae Albums chart.

Start from Scratch marked the departure of original keyboardist Adam Willis from the band in 2010. It was the first album to feature Mike DeGuzman on the keys, who was discovered after playing with The Expendables in Chicago during the 2010 Winter Blackout Tour. Adam Willis had left the band for personal reasons after the decision to not continue touring and parted ways with Passafire amicably.

They also released Remixed From Scratch in 2012, which featured dub music mixes and remixes of their songs from the previous album.

Vines (2013)
In 2013, Passafire signed with NYC's Easy Star Records, who welcomed them to the Easy Star family.
Passafire's fifth album, Vines, was released on November 11, 2013 and ranked at #1 on the Billboard Top Reggae Albums chart. This came after working again with Paul Leary, who also worked alongside Sublime, Pepper, U2, Slightly Stoopid, and several other successful groups.

Interval EP (2015)
The band released their EP, Interval on March 24, 2015, which featured four new songs that continued their sound in new directions into "progressive reggae".

Longshot (2017)
On May 12, 2017, the band released their sixth album, Longshot, along with a 2-song Longshot B-Sides EP on June 28, 2017 which included bonus track left off the LP.

A year later, Passafire released their latest live album Live in Atlanta on November 2, 2018. In 2019, they were also featured on Sugarshack Sessions Selects Vol. 1 with a live acoustic single of their song "Submersible".

Passafire was featured as one of many reggae bands on Collie Buddz riddim album, Cali Roots Riddim 2021 with their single, "Waste No Time", which was produced by Buddz and mixed by Stick Figure's touring guitarist, producer Johnny Cosmic.

In 2021, Passafire was one of several reggae and punk bands on The House That Bradley Built, a charity compilation honoring Sublime's lead singer Bradley Nowell, helping musicians with substance abuse. They covered Sublime's song "Greatest Hits".

Strata (2021)
Passafire recorded their seventh album, Strata which released on Flame Guy Records on September 17, 2021. "The first three singles on Strata ("Keepin' On", Sleepless", and "Friends") were written and released before the COVID-19 pandemic. Bowne explains, "The pandemic kinda stopped things. We're all dispersed across the country now so when the pandemic hit we all went back to our home bases. When we were able to get together, we wrote and recorded the last seven songs on the album within a week. We're excited that we're able to tour again and perform our old and new jams. It's touring and sharing our music that keeps our band alive."

Tours
Passafire has been regularly touring, playing shows with bands such as 311 (on the 311 Cruise in 2012 & 2019), Pepper (playing on the LAW Records Tour in October 2008), Rebelution, Matisyahu, Michael Franti and The Wailers. They also toured with Slightly Stoopid at the end of December, 2013.

Musical Style 
While earlier work mostly fits within the reggae-rock genre, the band's sound has taken on many forms since their self-titled release. Elements such as intricate lead guitar and unexpected instrumental breakdowns are reminiscent of progressive rock. This and other alternative influences are evident as early as their 2007 release, Submersible. In 2011, Start from Scratch explored more organic textures that touched on folk rock. The use of banjos, mandolins, acoustic guitar, and melodica (most notably on the album's title track, performed by new member Mike DeGuzman) were a temporary shift in sound that would influence later releases.

Lineup

Current members
 Ted Bowne – Guitar, Vocals (2003–present)
 Nick Kubley – Drums (2003–present)
 Will Kubley – Bass, Vocals (2006–present) (beginning with the album Submersible).
 Mike DeGuzman – Keyboards (2011–present) (beginning with the album Start From Scratch).

Former members
 Adam Willis – Keyboards (2003–2010) (on albums Passafire, Submersible, and Everyone On Everynight).
 Tom Heet – Bass (2003–2006) (on album Passafire).

Discography

Studio albums

Live albums/EPs

Singles

References

External links 
 
 Official Passafire website

See also 
SCAD Notable Alumni

Rock music groups from Georgia (U.S. state)
Easy Star Records artists
Reggae rock groups
Musical groups from Savannah, Georgia